Vyacheslav Kim (born June 12, 1969, in Almaty, Kazakhstan) is an economist, financier, public figure, cofounder, shareholder and chairman of the Board of Directors at Kaspi.kz, President of the Kazakhstan National Taekwondo Federation.

Vyacheslav Kim is one of the top-ten most influential and richest businessmen of Kazakhstan.

Education 
A graduate of the Republican Physics and Mathematics School (1996). Graduated from the Abai Kazakh National Pedagogical University with a degree of Financial Economist (1998), Russian-Kazakh Modern Humanitarian University with a degree of Financier (2002).

1987–1989 – military service in the USSR Armed Forces.

Early career 
In 1990, he founded the Konovalov’s Ophthalmology Clinic in cooperation with his partner. 

1996–2004 – retail business and electronic equipment distribution at ALTAIR JSC, Asia Technics LLP, ATG LLP.

1993–2005 – one of the founders and owners of the country’s largest retailer Planet of Electronics Network of Stores.  

2003–2004 – chairman of the Supervisory Board of the Kazakhstan Association of Manufacturers and Equipment.  

2004–2005 – president of Asia Technics Group JSC. 

2004–2006 – adviser to the Minister of Economy and Budget Planning of the Republic of Kazakhstan.  

2005–2006 – Managing Director of Economics at Kazakhstan Temir Zholy JSC.

Kaspi.kz
In 1993, Vyacheslav Kim opened the Planet of Electronics Store, which became the country’s largest store in less than a decade, but Kim wanted more: he knew that sales could be increased by giving loans to people. After the USSR collapsed, Kazakhstan was going through difficult times: per capita GDP was contracting from 1990 until 2000. Stores could not give their own loans, so they began to buy banking organizations. In 2002, Vyacheslav Kim made a deal with the newly privatized local Bank Kaspiyskiy. However, it was not so easy to combine trade and lending. The entrepreneur began seeking investment partners who might help him, and learned about the Baring Vostok Fund, which acquired a stake in the company. This led to Mikheil Lomtadze joining the management team in 2007, who together with Vyacheslav Kim transformed Kaspi to the biggest Kazakhstan fintech company. 

The value of his stake in Kaspi.kz after successful Kaspi.kz IPO on the London Stock Exchange in October 2020 was estimated by Bloomberg at $1.9 billion.      

On February 21, 2020, president of Kazakhstan Kassym-Jomart Tokayev held a meeting with Vyacheslav Kim and Chairman of the Kaspi.kz Board Mikhail Lomtadze, at which discussions addressed the digital service development strategy, prospects for e-commerce growth in Kazakhstan and the Company’s plans to support small and medium-sized businesses. The President emphasized the importance of using technological innovations in Kaspi.kz activities. One year later, on February 26, 2021, President of Kazakhstan Kassym-Jomart Tokayev held a second meeting with the Kaspi.kz founders Vyacheslav Kim and Mikheil Lomtadze during which promising areas of joint activity of the state bodies and Kaspi.kz were identified, including in the development of non-cash payments in Kazakhstan. The next meeting took place on May 31, 31, 2022, at which the president discussed the promising plans of Kaspi.kz fintech company development.

Other projects

A co-owner of Kolesa Group since 2013.    

A co-owner of the Alseco Company since 2015.

2016–2019 – a member of the Board of Directors and Independent Director of Group of Companies Allur JSC.

2017–2019 – a co-owner of the Magnum Retail Chain. 

The chairman of the Supervisory Board of the Magnum Retail Chain since 2019.

In 2021-2022 – Independent Director on the Board of Directors of National Welfare Fund "Samruk-Kazyna" JSC".

Wealth and Position in the Forbes Ranking

Since 2002, Vyacheslav Kim has been at the top of the list of the richest people in Kazakhstan being annually published by Forbes Kazakhstan. He moved up from No. 24 position in 2012 to No. 2 position in 2021, with the wealth estimated at $4,200 million. In 2021, he took the number 5 spot among the most influential businessmen of Kazakhstan and entered the global list of billionaires, rated 925th

Social activity

Support for Public and Sports Organizations 
2016–2019 – President of the Kazakhstan  Kendo and Iaido Federation.   

November 11, 2013 – President of the Kazakhstan Taekwondo Federation. During leadership of the Taekwondo Federation by Vyacheslav Kim, the Federation started receiving funding, athletes were provided with everything they needed: uniforms, sports gears and equipment. The coaches’ team added specialists from the countries traditionally showing good results in this sport.

A member of the Board of Trustees of the Fizmat Endowment Fund Public Foundation since April 13, 2017, a member of the board of directors of the republican school of Physics and Mathematics.

In 2018, he became a member of the Board of Trustees of the Almaty Triathlon Federation. 

A member of the Board of Trustees of the Kazakhstan National Geographic Society since 2019.

Charity 
2010–2014 – sponsored the Ayala Charitable Foundation in the «Breathe, Baby» Project. 

A member of the Board of Trustees of the Mercy Voluntary Society since 2016. In March 2017, Vyacheslav Kim together with Mikheil Lomtadze donated an extensively repaired building with an area of 1,400 square meters to the «We will Win Autism» Project 

One of the trustees and partners of the Saby Charitable Foundation in the «Build Your Business» Project since 2013  

In 2020, Kaspi.kz founders Vyacheslav Kim and Mikheil Lomtadze actively participated in the fight against the coronavirus pandemicproviding financial support to the health care sector of the Republic of Kazakhstan, allocating 100 million tenge for the purchase of rapid tests and artificial ventilators and donated 100 ambulances to the State to fight the pandemic.

In January 2022, founders of Kaspi.kz Vyacheslav Kim and Mikheil Lomtadze allocated 579 million tenge to support small business entities that had suffered during riots in Almaty. They transferred 10 billion tenge to the Fund "For the People of Kazakhstan" involved in solving the issues associated with healthcare, education, social support, as well as culture and sports.

Awards 
 The Order of Kurmet (December 14, 2007) – for merits in the development of the economy, social sector and active public work.
  
 The Order of Parasat (December 13, 2016)– for significant contribution to the socio-economic development of the Republic of Kazakhstan.

 «Enbegi Ushin» Badge and the title «A Citizen of Honour» Almaty (September 15, 2019) – for special contribution to development of the city.

 In 2020, for the first time in its history, the editorial board of Forbes Kazakhstan magazine announced two winners of the Businessman of the Year award – Vyacheslav Kim, the founder of Kaspi.kz, and Mikheil Lomtadze, the Chairman of the Management Board of the company.

References

 	

Kazakhstani businesspeople
Kazakhstani economists
1969 births
Living people